Mattawana is a census-designated place located in Bratton Township, Mifflin County in the state of Pennsylvania, United States on the east bank of the Juniata River.  The community is located near the junction of U.S. Route 522 and Pennsylvania Route 103, across the river from the borough of McVeytown.  As of the 2010 census the population was 276 residents.

Mattawana is a name derived from a Native American language purported to mean "river of shallows".

Demographics

References

Census-designated places in Mifflin County, Pennsylvania
Census-designated places in Pennsylvania